In mathematics, a dendrite is a certain type of topological space that may be characterized either as a locally connected dendroid or equivalently as a locally connected continuum that contains no simple closed curves.

Importance
Dendrites may be used to model certain types of Julia set.

References

See also

Misiurewicz point
Real tree, a related concept defined using metric spaces instead of topological spaces
Dendroid (topology) and unicoherent space, two more general types of tree-like topological space

Continuum theory
Trees (topology)